Doors and Windows may refer to:

Doors and Windows (EP), a 1995 EP by The Cranberries
Doors and Windows (album), a 2009 album by Bearfoot